Joseph Montgomery Harper (born 11 January 1948) is a Scottish former footballer, mainly remembered for his two spells with Aberdeen, during which he won the three main domestic trophies once each and became the club's record goalscorer with 206 goals in major competitions. He also played for Morton (two spells) and Hibernian in Scotland, and for Huddersfield Town and Everton in England. He finished his career in the Highland League.

Harper played for the Scotland national team five times, scoring seven goals.

Club career
Born in Greenock, Harper started his professional career with home-town club Morton, and returned to the club after a brief, unhappy spell with Huddersfield Town. He had at times a difficult relationship with some Morton supporters, but most fans recognised his ability and enthusiasm. He played for Morton against Chelsea in the Fairs Cup. Harper scored 74 goals in 122 appearances for Morton across both spells. Morton sold him for £35,000 to Huddersfield Town. He later returned to Morton for £15,000.

In 1969, Aberdeen manager Eddie Turnbull paid £40,000 to sign Harper, and in his first season with the Dons he helped them win the Scottish Cup for the second time in their history; Harper opened the scoring from the penalty spot as overwhelming pre-match favourites Celtic were defeated 3–1. He rapidly developed a reputation as a prodigious goalscorer and following a record-breaking haul of 33 goals in 34 league games in the 1971–72 season was the subject of much interest from English scouts.

Everton paid £180,000 for his services in December 1972 but his time in English football was not as productive as his Aberdeen spell and he returned to Scotland with Hibernian in early 1974, for the second time signed by Eddie Turnbull who had by this stage moved to Easter Road. Overweight and unfit when he arrived at Hibs, Harper struggled to rediscover his Aberdeen-era form in Edinburgh. He scored a hat-trick in the 1974 Scottish League Cup Final, but Dixie Deans also scored a hat-trick as Celtic defeated Hibs 6–3. Harper was never a favourite with the Hibs fans, and his arrival signalled the beginning of the decline of the team's fortunes through the late 1970s and 1980s.

Harper returned to Aberdeen under Ally MacLeod for the start of the 1976–77 season in a £50,000 deal and inspired instant success, the Dons defeating Celtic 2–1 (after extra time) to win the League Cup in November. Harper made further final appearances in each of the next two seasons, as Aberdeen lost both the 1977–78 Scottish Cup final and the 1978–79 League Cup final to Rangers, by a scoreline of 2–1 on each occasion. By the 1979–80 season he was considered a veteran and no longer a regular in the Dons first team but his seven goals helped Alex Ferguson become the second Scottish League-winning Aberdeen manager after Dave Halliday in 1954–55. Harper left Pittodrie after only one appearance the following season in the wake of a fallout with Ferguson.

In total Harper scored 205 competitive goals for Aberdeen, a club record. Of that total, 122 were scored in league fixtures, 70 in domestic cup games (including 6 in the pre-season Drybrough Cup, not counted in some totals) and 7 in European competition. His iconic status amongst Aberdeen supporters was recognised when he was amongst the first players to be inducted to the club's "Hall of Fame". Joe's notoriety with Aberdeen fans also earned him the title 'King of the Beach End' (traditional home end at Pittodrie).

International career
Harper was involved in a Scotland overseas tour in 1967, scoring five times against a Canada Olympic team. The Scottish Football Association decided in October 2021 to reclassify this game as a full international.

He next played for Scotland in October 1972, scoring in a 4–1 win against Denmark. He played in Scotland's next game but then fell out of the international reckoning, only earning a recall in 1975. By coincidence, the occasion was another away match with Denmark, but this was overshadowed by a controversial off-field incident; Harper and several teammates were given lifetime bans by the Scottish Football Association after it was alleged that they had been involved in a nightclub incident where a light was broken and an altercation followed. Harper later said that he had been punished because he had returned to the team base in the same taxi as the other players. The ban on two of the players, Harper and Arthur Graham, was lifted a year later. 

Harper was selected in the Scotland squad for the 1978 FIFA World Cup. He appeared in the 1–1 draw against Iran, which was also his last international appearance, as Scotland exited in the first round.

Later life
In 1981 Harper was appointed manager of then Highland League side Peterhead. He helped the Blue Toon to a second place league finish but his reported wages were beyond the club's means and he was replaced for the 1982–83 season by former Pittodrie teammate Dave Smith. Harper later managed Huntly, where he was succeeded by Steve Paterson in October 1990.

Harper has also been a columnist for the Aberdeen Evening Express. An autobiography, which was co-written by Evening Express sports editor Charlie Allan, was published in 2008. Harper was appointed honorary Club President of Aberdeenshire Amateur League side Halliburton AFC in 2009. In the early 21st century he often worked on home match days for Aberdeen in as the host of the 'Legends' Hospitality Lounge of the Richard Donald stand at Pittodrie Stadium.

Career statistics

Club

International

Scores and results list Scotland's goal tally first

Honours 

Greenock Morton
Scottish First Division: 1966–67
Renfrewshire Cup: 1966–67

Aberdeen
Scottish Premier Division: 1979–80
Scottish Cup: 1969–70
Scottish League Cup: 1976–77
Drybrough Cup: 1971–72
Aberdeenshire Cup: 1980–81

Individual
European Bronze Boot: 1971–72
Scottish Football Hall of Fame: 2019

See also
List of footballers in Scotland by number of league goals (200+)
 List of Scotland national football team hat-tricks

References

Sources
Harry Reid (2005), The Final Whistle?, Birlinn, 
King Joey, Joe Harper with Charlie Allan, Birlinn (2008)

External links 

1948 births
Living people
Scottish footballers
Aberdeen F.C. players
Everton F.C. players
Hibernian F.C. players
Greenock Morton F.C. players
Huddersfield Town A.F.C. players
Peterhead F.C. managers
Scottish football managers
Scotland international footballers
1978 FIFA World Cup players
Footballers from Greenock
Scottish Football League players
English Football League players
Association football forwards
Scottish Football League representative players
Highland Football League players
Keith F.C. players
Scotland under-23 international footballers
Scottish league football top scorers
Scottish Football Hall of Fame inductees
Huntly F.C. managers
Highland Football League managers